The Pasteur Institute is an institute located in Algiers, Algeria. Its library holds 47,000 volumes.

Missions 
The Institute has the following missions: carrying out analyzes and diagnoses, it also ensures epidemiological surveillance, research, training, production and import and distribution of the main vaccines to health establishments and animal husbandry. laboratory animals that are the subject of experiments.

Directors 
 Jean Baptiste Paulin Trolard ( – )
 Edmond Sergent ( – )
 Albert Calmette ( – )
 Edmond Sergent ( – )
 Docteur Beguet ( – )
 Robert Neil ( – ) 
 Mostefa Benhassine ( – ) 
 Amar Benaouda ( – )
 Mohamed Chérif Abbadi ( – )
 Fadila Boulahbal ( – )
 Mohamed Tazir ( – )
 Miloud Belkaid ( – )
 Hadj Ahmed Lebres ( – )
 Mohamed Chérif Abbadi
 Mohamed Tazir ( – )
 Mohamed Mansouri
 Kamel Kezzal ( – )
 Zoubir Harrat ( – )
 Fawzi Derrar ( – present)

References

External links
 Official website

1894 establishments in Algeria
Educational organisations based in Algeria
Medical and health organisations based in Algeria
Medical research institutes
Microbiology institutes
Non-profit organisations based in Algeria
Organisations based in Algiers
Algeria
Research institutes in Algeria
National public health agencies